Vahan may refer to:

 Vahana, a Sanskrit word meaning "vehicle", more specifically "a vehicle of consciousness"
 volkswagen derived from sanskrit root "Lokvahan"
 Vahan, Armenia, a town
 Vahan, Iran, a village in Hamadan Province, Iran
 VAHAN (firearm), an Armenian manufactured assault rifle
 Vahan (given name), of Armenian origin meaning "shield"